Nomocharis is a genus of flowering plants in the family Liliaceae. It consists of about 7 species native to montane regions of western China, Myanmar, and northern India. They are similar to Lilium, with one of the more obvious differences being the flowers being more shallow or sometimes flat.

Taxonomy
The World Checklist of Selected Plant Families, considers Nomocharis a separate genus in its own right, however some authorities consider Nomocharis to be embedded within Lilium, rather than treat it as a separate genus. Including Kew and United States Department of Agriculture and the Agricultural Research Service on 13 July 2010.

Species
The World Checklist of Selected Plant Families accepted 10 species :

 Nomocharis aperta (Franch.) W.W.Sm. & W.E.Evans
 Nomocharis basilissa Farrer ex W.E.Evans
 Nomocharis farreri (W.E.Evans) Cox
 Nomocharis georgei W.E.Evans
 Nomocharis gongshanensis Y.D.Gao & X.J.He
 Nomocharis meleagrina Franch.
 Nomocharis oxypetala (D.Don) E.H.Wilson
 Nomocharis pardanthina Franch.
 Nomocharis saluenensis Balf.f.
 Nomocharis synaptica Sealy

References

Bibliography
 
 
 

Liliaceae
Liliaceae genera
Taxa named by Adrien René Franchet